Saint Martin Island is a small island (area only 3 km2) in the northeastern part of the Bay of Bengal, about 9 km south of the tip of the Cox's Bazar-Teknaf peninsula, and forming the southernmost part of Bangladesh. There is a small adjoining island that is separated at high tide, called Chera Dwip.

History and description 
Millennia ago, the island used to be an extension of the Teknaf peninsula, but at a later time some portion of this peninsula got submerged and thus the southernmost part of the aforementioned peninsula became an island, and was disconnected from the Bangladesh mainland. The first settlement started 250 years ago, in 18th century, by Arabian merchants who named the island 'Jazira'. During British occupation the island was named after the then Deputy Commissioner of Chittagong Mr. Martin as St. Martin Island. Likely  because one or more of the Arabs were Saint and whose name could not be identified. Local names of the island are "Narikel jinjira" which means 'Coconut Island', and "Daruchini Dwip" which means "Cinnamon island". It is the only coral island in Bangladesh.

Administration 
The island makes up the Saint Martin's Union Parishad. It has 9 villages/areas:

 Paschim Para (Western Neighbourhood)
 Deil Para
 Uttar Para (Northern Neighbourhood)
 Majher Para (Middle Neighbourhood)
 Purba Para (Eastern Neighbourhood)
 Konar Para (Edge Neighbourhood)
 Nazrul Para (Neighbourhood of Nazrul)
 Golachipa (literally "narrow neck")
 Dakkhin Para (Southern Neighbourhood)

Inhabitants 

Most of the island's approximately 3,700 inhabitants live primarily from fishing. The other staple crops are rice and coconut. Being very common on the island, algae are collected, dried, and exported to Myanmar. Between October and April, the fishermen from neighboring areas bring their caught fishes to the island's temporary wholesale market. However, imports of chicken, meat and other foods come in from the mainland Bangladesh and Myanmar. As the centre and the south are mainly farmland and makeshift huts, most of the permanent structures are around the far north.

During the rainy season, because of the dangerous conditions on the Bay of Bengal, the inhabitants have no scope to go to the mainland (Teknaf) and their life can become dangerous. There is a hospital on the island, but in the past there has often been no doctor.

Biological diversity and bioprospecting potential 
Research by the Bangladesh Department of Environment (DoE), with the assistance of the UNDP, demonstrates that the island has a number of ecosystems, including coral-rich areas, mangroves, lagoons and stony areas. The island is a safe haven to various species of fauna. The presence of 153 species of sea weeds, 66 species of coral, 187 species of oysters, 240 species of fish, 120 species of birds, 29 species of reptiles and 29 species of mammals were recorded at the St Martin's Island in 2010. The area in vicinity has been declared as a Marine Protected Area in 2022.

S.I. Paul et al. (2021) collected 9 species of marine sponges (phylum: Porifera) from the Saint Martin's Island. These are: Niphates erecta, Mycale macilenta, Plakortis dariae, Cliona celata, Cliona carteri, Cliona viridis, Haliclona rosea, Haliclona oculata, and Hemimycale columella. Marine sponges and their associated microbes produce an enormous array of antitumor, antiviral, anti-inflammatory, immunosuppressive, antibiotic and other bioactive molecules.

S.I. Paul et al. (2021) explored a total of 15 bacterial genera comprising 31 different bacterial species from the 9 collected marine sponges of the island. Among them Bacillus subtilis strains WS1A and YBS29 have great probiotic potential. It can produce antimicrobial compounds and prevent motile Aeromonas septicemia disease (a major fish disease in Bangladesh) of Rohu (Labeo rohita). Bacillus subtilis strains WS1A and YBS29 produce different types of antimicrobial peptides. Fish (Labeo rohita) fed with extracellular products of Bacillus subtilis strains WS1A and YBS29 develop complete disease resistance. The metabolites and bioactive compounds derived from marine sponges and sponge microbes also afford abundant potential for pharmaceutical and biotechnological applications.

Transportation 

The only way to reach Saint Martin Island is by water transportation: boats and ships (mostly for tourists) from Cox Bazar and Teknaf. It is the southernmost union of Bangladesh situated in 120 km away from the Cox’s Bazar city. The only internal transport for island is non motorized van (pulled by man.) The roads are made of concrete, and their condition are decent. All most hotels run generators until 11 PM which are not allowed afterwards, so they then rely on solar power, which is popular throughout the island. There is no electricity supply from the national grid since a hurricane in 1991.

Tourism 

Saint Martin Island has become a tourist spot, and Eight shipping liners run daily trips to the island. Nowadays, tourist has become friendly to Eco tourism. Consequently, eco friendly resort- Josnaloy Beach Resort has become popular to them. Tourists can book their trip either from Chittagong or from Cox's Bazar. The surrounding coral reef has an extension named Chera Dwip. A small bush is there, which is the only green part. People do not live on this part, so it is advisable for the tourists to go there early and come back by afternoon.

A number of efforts have been proposed to preserve the several endangered species of turtles that nest on the island, as well as the corals, some of which are found only on Narikel Jinjira. Pieces of the coral reef are being removed to be sold to tourists. Nesting turtles are sometimes taken for food, and their hatchlings are often distracted by the twinkling lights along the beach. Fish, a few recently discovered, are being overfished. Every year the fishermen must venture further out to sea to get their catch. Most of them use motorless boats.

It is possible to walk around the island in a day because it measures only 8 km2 (3 sq. mile), shrinking to about 5 km2 (2 sq. mi) during high tide. The island exists only because of its coral base, so removal of that coral risks erosion of the beach.

Saint Martin lost 70% of its coral reef between 1980 and 2018 due to anthropogenic factors.

Josnaloy Beach Resort 

This Island has about 230 numbers of Hotel & Resort. Josnaloy Beach Resort is one of the most popular eco resort from them. It is situated at West Beach- Nazrul Para/ Golachipa of Island.

Sovereignty dispute and shootings of St. Martin's fishermen 
Fishing is one of largest professional activities of St. Martin's Island's 5,500 residents; however, territorial disputes between Myanmar and Bangladesh have resulted in a state of tension between the countries that can erupt into violence, often targeting unarmed Bangladeshi fishermen. Below is a brief summary of shooting incidents against St. Martin's fishermen:
 On October 7, 1998, between three and five Bangladeshi fishermen were killed by Burmese Navy forces just off the coast of St. Martin's Island.
 On September 8, 1999, one Bangladeshi fisherman was shot and killed by Burmese Navy forces near Saint Martin Island. Nine crewmen from the victim's fishing boat abandoned it, swam for their lives, and were rescued by Bangladeshi forces. The Bangladeshi government lodged a formal protest note to Myanmar.
 On August 20, 2000, the Bangladeshi police reported that Burmese border guards had shot and killed four Bangladeshi fishermen off the coast of St. Martin's Island.
 In 2011 pirates attacked fishermen 5 km off the coast of Saint Martin Island and killed four of them.
 On 6 October 2018, the Government of Myanmar updated its 2015-2018 map of Myanmar Information Management Unit showing St. Martin as a part of their sovereign territory and spread the maps in two global websites. Following the event, the Myanmar Ambassador in Dhaka was summoned by the Government of Bangladesh on 6 October 2018. Rear Admiral (retd) M Khurshed Alam, maritime affairs secretary at the Ministry of Foreign Affairs, Government of Bangladesh handed over a strongly worded protest note to him. The Myanmar envoy said it was a “mistake” to show the Saint Martin Island as part of his country's territory.

Climate and weather 
The best weather is usually between November and February; this is the major tourist season. Between March and July, cyclones can strike. The island was devastated by a cyclone in 1991 but has fully recovered, and was untouched by the 2004 tsunami. March to July is off-season for tourists.

Gallery

See also 

 List of islands of Bangladesh
 Tourism in Bangladesh
 List of lighthouses in Bangladesh

References

Sources 
 Islam, M. Z. 2001. First Reef Check Survey in Bangladesh.  Reef Check Newsletter, Volume-6, Issue 2, August 2006.
 Islam, M. Z. 2005. St. Martin Pilot Project, National Conservation Strategy (NCS) Implementation Project-1, Final Report, Ministry of Environment & Forest, Government of the People's Republic of Bangladesh, 2001, 119 pp.
 Marinelife Alliance, 2016. Final Report: Conservation of Sea Turtle along Bangladesh Coastal & Marine Territory, under Strengthening Regional Protection for Wildlife Protection Project (SRCWPP), Bangladesh Forest Department, Project ID-W2-06, 2013. 2016 Dec, 112 Pg.

External links 
 
 
 
 
 

Islands of Bangladesh
Islands of the Bay of Bengal
Chittagong Division
Cox's Bazar District
Lighthouses in Bangladesh
Coral islands
Populated places in Bangladesh